Minister for Nordic Cooperation may refer to:

 Minister for Nordic Cooperation (Denmark)
 Minister for Nordic Cooperation (Finland)
 Minister for Nordic Cooperation (Iceland)
 Minister of Nordic Cooperation (Norway)
 Minister for Nordic Cooperation (Sweden)